The Macao Conservatory is a public conservatory in Macau, a special administrative region of China.

The conservatory, which provides secondary education at the general (junior high school) level as well as technical and vocational upper secondary (senior high school/sixth-form college) instruction, has separate schools for music, dance, and theatre. The schools of music and dance are designated as public secondary school programmes by the Education and Youth Affairs Bureau. The conservatory headquarters and the school of music are in two separate facilities in São Lázaro; the school of music is adjacent to the Saint Lazarus Church. The schools of dance and theatre are in two separate facilities in Sé.

References

Note
 Some information originated from List of schools in Macau

External links

 Macao Conservatory 
 Macao Conservatory  (Traditional)
 Macao Conservatory  (Simplified)
 Documents related to the conservatory at the Government Printing Bureau: Portuguese and Traditional Chinese

Senior secondary schools in China
Secondary schools in China
Schools in Macau
Dance schools in China
Music schools in China
Theatre in China
Sé, Macau